John Harvey was a Scottish football player and manager.

References

Scottish footballers
Heart of Midlothian F.C. players
East Fife F.C. players
Kilmarnock F.C. players
Leeds United F.C. wartime guest players
Scottish Football League players
Heart of Midlothian F.C. non-playing staff
Scottish football managers
Heart of Midlothian F.C. managers
Scottish Football League managers
Year of death missing
Year of birth missing
Association football wing halves